János Greminger (5 May 1929 – 17 October 2009) was a Hungarian basketball player. He was born in Szeged.

Hungarian national team
Greminger was a member of the senior men's Hungarian national basketball team. He was a part of the Hungarian national team, that was eliminated after the group stage of the 1952 Summer Olympic Games. He played in all six of Hungary's games during the tournament. He was also a part of the Hungarian national team at the 1960 Summer Olympics in Rome, where Hungary finished in 9th place. He also played with Hungary at the 1964 Summer Olympics in Tokyo, where his team finished in 13th place.

References

1929 births
2009 deaths
Hungarian people of German descent
Hungarian men's basketball players
Olympic basketball players of Hungary
Basketball players at the 1952 Summer Olympics
Basketball players at the 1960 Summer Olympics
Basketball players at the 1964 Summer Olympics
FIBA EuroBasket-winning players
Sportspeople from Szeged